Tennis has been a sport in the program of the University Athletic Association of the Philippines (UAAP) men's division since the 1949–1950 season. The women's tennis competition started in the 2001–2002 season.

Champions list

Streaks
 Far Eastern University owns the longest championship streak in the Men's Division with 7 consecutive titles. 
 University of Santo Tomas and National University have the longest championship streak in the Women's Division with 4 consecutive titles each.

Double crown
 De La Salle University won a "double crown" in  Season 2003–04.
 University of Santo Tomas won a "back-to-back double crown" in  Seasons 2006–07 & 2007–08.
 National University won three consecutive double crown in Seasons 2013-14, 2014-2015, and 2015-2016. Also earned their fourth double crown in Season 2018-19.

Number of championships by school

References

Tennis
Tennis tournaments in the Philippines